Kolhapur Lok Sabha seat is one of the 48 Lok Sabha (parliamentary) constituencies in Maharashtra state  India.

Assembly segments
Presently, after the implementation of the Presidential notification on delimitation on 19 February 2008, Kolhapur Lok Sabha constituency comprises six Vidhan Sabha (legislative assembly) segments. These segments are:

Members of Parliament

Election results

General elections 2019

General elections 2014

General elections 2009

General elections 1977
 Desai Dajiba Balwantrao (PWP) : 186,077 votes 
 Mane Shankarrao Dattatray (INC) : 185,912
 Dajiba Desai defeated Shankarrao Mane by just 165 votes, the lowest winning margin in 1977 Lok Sabha elections for any seat. The highest margin for 1977 was recorded by Ram Vilas Paswan in Hajipur.

See also
 Kolhapur district
 List of Constituencies of the Lok Sabha

Notes

External links
 A map of the Lok Sabha constituencies in Maharashtra
Kolhapur lok sabha  constituency election 2019 results details

Lok Sabha constituencies in Maharashtra
Kolhapur district